Maravillas is a 1981 Spanish film directed by Manuel Gutiérrez Aragón. It was entered into the 31st Berlin International Film Festival.

Cast
 Cristina Marcos - Maravillas
 Fernando Fernán Gómez - Fernando
 Enrique San Francisco - Chessman
 Francisco Merino - Salomón Toledo
 León Klimovsky - Santos
 Eduardo MacGregor - Simón
 Gérard Tichy - Benito
 George Rigaud - Tomás (as Jorge Rigaud)
 José Luis Fernández 'Pirri' - Pirri (as Pirri Fernandez)
 Yolanda Medina - Loles
 Miguel Molina - Miqui
 José Manuel Cervino - Juez
 Paco Catalá - Perista

References

External links

1981 films
Spanish comedy-drama films
1980s Spanish-language films
Films directed by Manuel Gutiérrez Aragón
1980s Spanish films
Spanish thriller films